William Hutchinson "Dodo" Brinker (August 30, 1883 - February 5, 1965) was a Major League Baseball outfielder and third baseman. Brinker played for the Philadelphia Phillies in the  season. In 9 career games, he had 4 hits in 18 at-bats. He batted right and left and threw right-handed.

He attended the University of Washington.  He played college baseball for the Huskies from 1903–1905 and was the program's head coach 1906, 1909–1910, 1915–1916, and 1918–1919.

Brinker was born in Warrensburg, Missouri and died in Arcadia, California.

References

External links
 Baseball Reference.com page

1883 births
1965 deaths
Philadelphia Phillies players
Major League Baseball outfielders
Washington Huskies baseball players
Washington Huskies baseball coaches
Bellingham Gillnetters players
Seattle Siwashes players
Grays Harbor Lumbermen players
Aberdeen Black Cats players
Spokane Indians players
Vancouver Beavers players
Baseball players from Missouri